Neil Burstyn (July 17, 1939 – November 9, 1978), known as Neil Nephew, was an American actor, writer and story editor.

His works as an actor include Panic in Year Zero! (1962), The Rebel Rousers (1970) and Alex in Wonderland (1970). He also worked as a story editor, writing two episodes of The Monkees in late 1967 and in early 1968.

Early life
Nephew was born as Neil Bernstein in New York City. He was married to the actress Ellen Burstyn from 1964 to 1972.

Career
As an actor, Nephew appeared in the film Panic in Year Zero! in the role of Andy. As a writer, he wrote two episodes of  The Monkees: "The Monkees' Christmas Show" (Air date: December 25, 1967) and "The Monstrous Monkee Mash" (Air date: January 22, 1968). In 1970, he appeared in the film The Rebel Rousers and in the film Alex in Wonderland with his then wife Ellen Burstyn.

Personal life
Nephew married actress Ellen Burstyn in 1964. In her autobiography, Burstyn states that her husband began to use Burstyn, his grandfather's name, when at that time they were legally Mr. and Mrs. Bernstein. When she received a call from a film producer asking her what name should be used in the credits of Alex in Wonderland, she decided to change her name from Ellen McRae to Ellen Burstyn.

In her autobiography, Burstyn tells that Neil was schizophrenic; he had episodes of violence and eventually left her. He attempted to reconcile, but she ultimately divorced him in 1972.

Nephew killed himself in 1978 by jumping from the window of his ninth-floor Manhattan apartment as his depression and schizophrenia began to reach its climax.

Filmography

References

External links
 
  – as Neil J. Burstyn

1939 births
1978 deaths
20th-century American male actors
Male actors from New York City
American male film actors
Suicides by jumping in New York City
1978 suicides